Pitcairnia caricifolia, synonym Pepinia caricifolia, is a species in the genus Pepinia. This species is native to tropical South America.

References

caricifolia
Flora of Bolivia
Flora of Brazil
Flora of Colombia
Flora of French Guiana
Flora of Guyana
Flora of Suriname
Flora of Venezuela